Ann Reid is an American scientist. Since 2014, she is the executive director of the National Center for Science Education.

Education
Reid graduated from Bard College at Simon's Rock in environmental science, obtained a master's degree in International Studies at Johns Hopkins University.

Career

At age 21 Reid worked at the Organisation for Economic Co-operation and Development (OECD) in Paris for three years. Disappointed with diplomatic work, she went back to the United States to develop a career in medical research, starting as a technician at the Walter Reed Army Medical Center, then as a molecular biologist at the Armed Forces Institute of Pathology, where she started to write about science education. While at the AFIP, she did a large part of the laboratory work leading to the sequencing of the 1918 influenza virus.

From 2010 to 2013, she was the director of the American Academy of Microbiology.
She was appointed as executive director of the National Center for Science Education in 2014.

In her role as a spokesperson for the NCSE, Reid is frequently called upon by the media to comment on news stories related to science education and the place of science in public policy. She has been interviewed by The New York Times, The Washington Post, NPR, CBS, and other national news outlets.

Selected publications

References

21st-century American women scientists
Bard College alumni
Johns Hopkins University alumni
American molecular biologists
American medical researchers
Year of birth missing (living people)
Living people